Adagodi  is a village in Shimoga district, Karnataka, India. It is located in the Hosanagara taluk.

See also 
 Shimoga
 Districts of Karnataka

References

External links 
 http://Shimoga.nic.in/

Villages in Shimoga district